Olga Evgenievna Petrova is a former Russian international football midfielder who played for Ryazan. She has won four Russian leagues, five national Cups and the 2005 U-19 Euro.

She took part in the 2009 Euro and 2013 Euro.

Career
Having spent nine years at Rossiyanka, in December 2013 she headed for UEFA Champions League winners Wolfsburg signing a one and a half year contract. Three month later she returned to Russia because of homesickness. She only played two matches in the second team of Wolfsburg.

References

External links
 
 

1986 births
Living people
Russian women's footballers
Russia women's international footballers
Expatriate women's footballers in Germany
Russian expatriate sportspeople in Germany
VfL Wolfsburg (women) players
Nadezhda Noginsk players
WFC Rossiyanka players
Ryazan-VDV players
Women's association football midfielders
Russian Women's Football Championship players